The 1995 Illawarra Steelers season was the club's fourteenth season in its history. During the height of the Super League War, the club lost its coach, Graham Murray after round 4, with club legend Allan Fitzgibbon taking over in a caretaker role for the rest of the season. The Steelers finished the season in 12th, missing the finals series.

Players

Squad 

 (captain)

Player Movements

Ladder

Auckland Warriors were stripped of 2 competition points due to exceeding the replacement limit in round 3.

Home Crowd Averages

References

External links

Illawarra Steelers seasons
Illawarra